A manila folder (sometimes manila) is a file folder designed to contain documents, often within a filing cabinet. It is generally formed by folding a large sheet of stiff card in half. Though traditionally buff, sometimes other colors are used to differentiate categories of files.

History 
The manila component of the name originates from manila hemp, locally known as abacá, historically the main material for manila folders, alongside the manila envelope and manila paper.

Use
The manila folder, is a folder designed for transporting documents. It is traditionally made of thick, durable manila paper and sized so that full sheets of printer paper can fit inside without folding. As with the manila envelope, it is traditionally buff in color.

The manila envelope, a close relative of the folder, often has a mechanism on the closing flap that allows it to be opened without damaging the envelope so that it can be reused. There are two main methods to achieve this. The first incorporates a metal clasp with two prongs, which are put through a reinforced eyelet in the flap and then bent apart to hold, while the other has a cardboard button secured tightly on the flap and a piece of string fastened on the envelope body (or the reverse arrangement) is wound around it to form a closure. In a more general sense, similar envelopes made of brown, unbleached paper, used for cheapness, are also  described as manila envelopes.

References

See also
 File folder
 Pee Chee folder
 Ring binder

Office equipment
Paper products
Stationery